With the outbreak of the American Civil War, the northwestern state of Wisconsin raised 91,379 soldiers for the Union Army, organized into 53 infantry regiments, 4 cavalry regiments, a company of Berdan's sharpshooters, 13 light artillery batteries and 1 unit of heavy artillery. Most of the Wisconsin troops served in the Western Theater, although several regiments served in Eastern armies, including three regiments within the famed Iron Brigade. 3,794 were killed in action or mortally wounded, 8,022 died of disease, and 400 were killed in accidents. The total mortality was 12,216 men, about 13.4 percent of total enlistments.

Soldiers
Approximately 1 in 9 residents (regardless of age, sex or qualification for service) served in the army, and, in turn, half the eligible voters served. Wisconsin was the only state to organize replacements for troops that had already been fielded, leading northern generals to prefer having some regiments from the state under their command if possible.

A number of Wisconsin regiments were distinguished, including three that served in the celebrated "Iron Brigade"— the 2nd Wisconsin, 6th Wisconsin, and 7th Wisconsin. All were noted for their hard fighting and dashing appearance, being among the only troops in the Army of the Potomac to wear Hardee hats and long frock coats. They suffered severely at the Battle of Gettysburg in July 1863. The 8th Wisconsin, another hard-fighting regiment, was often accompanied into battle by its mascot, Old Abe, a bald eagle.

In a January 1863 letter to his sister, Union soldier Chauncey Herbert Cooke, a private from Company G of the 25th Wisconsin Infantry Regiment, gave his reasons for fighting for the Union in the war, stating that "I have no heart in this war if the slaves cannot go free."

Women during the war
While men were fighting, many women needed to learn how to farm and do other manual labor. Besides having to tend to the home and children while the men were away at war, women also contributed supplies. Quilts and blankets were often given to soldiers. Some had encouraging messages sewn on them. One quilt that was made in 1864 by a group of women in Green Bay had the following poem:

Other items women often sent included: shirts, sheets, pillows, pillowcases, coats, vests, trousers, towels, handkerchiefs, socks, bandages, canned fruits, dried fruits, butter, cheese, wine, eggs, pickles, books, and magazines. At one point, after the Battle of Resaca, women sent every wounded man within a certain distance a fresh orange or lemon. These fruits were to quench the strong thirst that was known to accompany a wound.

See also
 List of Wisconsin Civil War units
 Belgian immigrants in Wisconsin during the Civil War

References

Further reading
 Carr, Jo Ann Daly, ed. Such Anxious Hours: Wisconsin Women's Voices from the Civil War (University of Wisconsin Press, 2020).
 Hurn, Ethel A. Wisconsin Women in the War between the States. Madison: Wisconsin History Commission, 1911.

 Klement, Frank L. Wisconsin and the Civil War. Madison: State Historical Society of Wisconsin, 1963.
 Klement, Frank L. Wisconsin in the Civil War: The Home Front and the Battle Front, 1861-1865. Madison: State Historical Society of Wisconsin, 1997. online
 Walterman, Thomas. There Stands "Old Rock": Rock County, Wisconsin and the War to Preserve the Union. Friendship, Wis: New Past Press, 2001.
 Wells, Robert W. Wisconsin in the Civil War. Milwaukee: Milwaukee Journal, 1962.
 Zimm, John. This Wicked Rebellion: Wisconsin Civil War Soldiers Write Home. Madison: Wisconsin Historical Society Press, 2012; primary sources

External links
 Wisconsin in the Civil War
 Civil War changed Wisconsin
 The Civil War Home Front

 
American Civil War by state